General Cross may refer to:

James U. Cross (1925–2015), U.S. Air Force brigadier general
Jesse Cross (fl. 1970s–2010s), U.S. Army brigadier general
Tim Cross (born 1951), British Army major general

See also
Attorney General Cross (disambiguation)